The Actress is a lost 1928 American silent drama film produced and distributed by Metro-Goldwyn-Mayer. The film was directed by Sidney Franklin, and starred Norma Shearer.

This film was based on the 1898 play Trelawny of the "Wells" by Arthur Wing Pinero that had first premiered on Broadway in 1898, starring Mary Mannering, which was revived by Ethel Barrymore in 1911, Laurette Taylor in 1925, and at the time this film was produced (1927) by Helen Gahagan. The play was first brought to the screen as a British made silent film Trelawny of the "Wells" in 1916.

This film is one of many lost MGM films dating from the 1920s.

Plot

Cast
 Norma Shearer as Rose Trelawny
 Owen Moore as Tom Wrench
 Gwen Lee as Avonia
 Lee Moran as Colpoys
 Roy D'Arcy as Gadd
 Virginia Pearson as Mrs. Telfer
 William J. Humphrey as Mr. Telfer
 Effie Ellsler as Mrs. Mossop
 Ralph Forbes as Arthur Gower
 O. P. Heggie as Vice-Chancellor Sir William Gower
 Andree Tourneur as Clara de Foenix
 Cyril Chadwick as Captain de Foenix
 Margaret Seddon as Miss Trafalgar Gower

References

External links

 
 
 
 
 Lantern slide for the film at the Cleveland Public Library

1928 films
1928 drama films
Silent American drama films
American silent feature films
American black-and-white films
Films about actors
Films about theatre
American films based on plays
Films directed by Sidney Franklin
Lost American films
Metro-Goldwyn-Mayer films
1928 lost films
Lost drama films
1920s American films
Films with screenplays by Richard Schayer
1920s English-language films